MALIK Fraternity Inc. previously known as 'Malik Sigma Psi"  is a college fraternity founded on May 13, 1977 at CW Post in Long Island University for men of color.   Rather than refer to themselves as being black Greeks, they prefer African Fraternalists.

African Fraternalism includes such beliefs as the African origin of civilization, reclaiming the stolen legacy of African knowledge, the oneness of all African peoples, the importance of ritual and initiation, the value of a male ritual kinship system, respect for and seeking equal partnership with women, the reception and cultivation of the Spirit of Learning, the necessity of serving the community, the calling to work on one's personal and spiritual development, the study and promotion of "MALIKology" and African symbology, and the usage of African symbolism. 
 
MALIKology is the Fraternity’s interpretation of the "science of manhood." The acronym MALIK is represented as Manhood, Achievement, Leadership, Integrity, and Knowledge. It is a synthesis of science, history, philosophy, and cultural values and practices from the African Diaspora about the nature, purpose, direction, function, and responsibility of manhood. The group's name partially comes from the Swahili name of Malcolm X. The group had originally used an all Swahili name but was forced to change it because or the college requirements at the school that all fraternities have at least two Greek letters in its name.  The fraternity was founded by 15 men of color.  Several of the Founders of the fraternity were of Latino ancestry.

Ideologically, the fraternity is against the idea of black Greeks.  The group is outside of the National Pan Hellenic Council.

Founders
Roland K. Hawkins, Larry B. Martin, Darryl L. Mitchell were the inspiration behind the founding of the fraternity and thus known as Khalifas, however the shapers of the brotherhood were: SC. James Banks, SC. Joseph Diaz Jr., SC. Edward Harris, SC. Ernest Heyward, SC. Lethorne Johnson, SC. George Lembrecht, SC. Kyle Little, SC. Anthony Pitts, SC. Edward Rivers, SC. Kevin Simon, SC. Bryant Stafford, SC. Al Washington.

It was the three Khalifahs that originated the concept of the fraternity and in turn recruited the other twelve men. This is why the Khalifahs have a special distinction.  The Crowns are called so as a symbol; every king tends to have a crown.  Although a fraternity, the Founders set the precedence of being very open with information, symbols, and knowledge. It was their belief that their communities have had an absence of awareness for so long that they could not afford to withhold valuable information from the masses.  This represents a major departure from the very secretive nature of traditional fraternalism.

Members
Members include Gil Noble, and Dr. Yosef Ben-Jochannan,   Richie Perez Reverend Herbert Daughtry, and Pablo Guzman.

History

The Fraternity was founded on May 13, 1977

1979 – MALIK Sigma Psi Fraternity is incorporated in the State of New York.
1984 – The first Kingdom is established at a State University of NY (Stony Brook University, The Jeem Kingdom).
1991 – The first Kingdom is established at an historically black college / university (HBCU) (Norfolk State University, The Ha Kingdom).
2002 – On May 18, 2002 MALIK Sigma Psi progresses and transitions its name to a complete African name (MALIK Fraternity, Inc.).
2017 – On April 12, 2017 the first Graduate & Professional Kingdom (referred to as a Shabazz Kingdom) in the South is chartered (Shabazz Ha Kingdom in Charlotte, NC, also referred to as the Charlotte MALIKs).
2017 – On April 25, 2017 the first undergraduate members are inducted from an Ivy League university (Cornell University).

Foundation
In 2013, the MALIK Foundation, Incorporated was established as an IRC Section 501(c)(3) "to ensure the freedom, resilience and wellness of African and African Diasporic communities..."  The Foundation holds an annual fundraising dinner called the Black History Month Gala. The foundation's focus areas are: male youth development, community resilience and leadership development.

Kingdom List

The Undergraduate Kingdoms (Chapters)  of MALIK Fraternity, Inc. are named after the letters in the Arabic Alphabet in the Common hijāʾī order:

Graduate Kingdoms
Graduate Kingdoms (Shabazz) are named after Locations
New York City Shabazz (Alif)
New Jersey Shabazz (Ba)
Charlotte Shabazz (Ha)
Orlando Shabazz
Washington D.C Shabazz

Undergraduate Villages

Undergraduate chapters are called villages until obtaining a specific amount of members

See also

History of North American fraternities and sororities
List of African-American Greek and fraternal organizations
List of Latino Greek-letter organizations

References

1977 establishments in New York (state)
African-American fraternities and sororities
Long Island University
Student organizations established in 1977